Mianej may refer to:

Mianej, Qazvin
Mianej, Zanjan